Kwannon is a character appearing in American comic books published by Marvel Comics. She first appeared in X-Men #17 (Feb. 1993) and was created by writer Fabian Nicieza and artist Andy Kubert. The character is most commonly associated with the X-Men, specifically the character of Betsy Braddock, with whom Kwannon was body-swapped for 29 years of publication history; in stories published during this period, the character used the moniker Revanche. After returning to her original body, she became the second Psylocke, while Braddock (who had previously used the codename while her mind was in Kwannon's body) became the new Captain Britain.

In her initial appearances, the character was depicted as a former assassin for the Hand with low-level empathic telepathy abilities and the power to generate a psionic sword. Since the franchise-wide relaunch Dawn of X, Kwannon has been featured as Psylocke in Fallen Angels, Hellions, and Marauders.

Publication history
Kwannon first appeared in X-Men #17 (Feb. 1993), created by writer Fabian Nicieza and artist Andy Kubert. She appeared in X-Men comics of this era until her death in X-Men #31. Much of the early narrative surrounding the character of Kwannon was confused by continuity errors created by Fabian Nicieza, who had failed to read Uncanny X-Men #255, which depicts the character of Psylocke being discovered on the shores of an island by ninjas of The Hand. Kwannon's origin described in X-Men #22 directly contradicted this scene, so subsequent comics introduced a convoluted series of events to explain away this and other inconsistencies.  Her body - or rather the original body of Betsy Braddock, which she had come to possess - is later briefly resurrected by The Sisterhood in Uncanny X-Men #509, but Kwannon herself does not appear.

Kwannon is later resurrected permanently and returned to her original body in the final pages of the limited series Hunt For Wolverine: Mystery In Madripoor #4, and she resurfaces in the 2019 series The Uncanny X-Men vol. 5 #16.

Kwannon took on the mantle of Psylocke, as part of the new Fallen Angels team alongside Cable and X-23. The relaunch was written by Bryan Edward Hill and penciled by Szymon Kudranski. After the conclusion of the Fallen Angels mini series, Kwannon was featured as the field leader of Mister Sinister's Hellions in the series of the same name written by Zeb Wells and Stephen Segovia. Kwannon was later featured as a member of the Marauders as the team was refocused on their mission of mutant rescue in the series relaunch by writer Steve Orlando.

Fictional character biography
The Japanese woman known as Kwannon was first seen as the prime assassin of the Japanese crimelord Nyoirin and lover of The Hand assassin Matsu'o Tsurayaba. With the criminal interests of Nyoirin and The Hand quickly coming into conflict, Kwannon elicits a promise from Matsu'o that they will fight to the death rather than betray their respective lords. During a duel at the estate of Nyoirin, Kwannon eventually falls from a cliff; with her physical injuries and lack of oxygen while underwater causing her to become brain-damaged and comatose. Nyoirin, who possesses an unrequited love for Kwannon, bids that Matsu'o take her to The Hand to be healed, with the promise that he will not cross their organisation again. The Hand is able to use their scientific and mystical resources to keep Kwannon's body alive, but is unable to resuscitate her mind.

Betsy Braddock Body Swap

Around this time The Hand discovers the telepathic Betsy Braddock washed ashore on one of their bases in the South China Sea, suffering complete amnesia after having passed through the Siege Perilous. The Hand presents her to Matsu'o who notes that she (and the X-Men) are assumed to be dead, and that he knows how The Hand may use her. Meeting with the supervillain and crime lord The Mandarin he offers him both the services of The Hand, and the opportunity to create a unique assassin - one with psionic gifts, who can mentally acquire the secrets of his enemies and kill with a thought - if he will use his skills at "conditioning" and sensory deprivation, in conjunction with the "spiritual resources" of The Hand to brain-wash Betsy. The two men are subsequently shown doing so, with a mind-controlled Psylocke, who is now East Asian in appearance, emerging from a sensory deprivation tank at the end of The Uncanny X-Men #256.

In a flashback scene from the same time period, Matsu'o and Nyoirin discuss placing Kwannon's mind in Betsy's body, adding that the transfer will require the use of the Mandarin's rings. It is revealed that Kwannon's "intuitive empathy" and "low-level telepathic abilities" made her mind capable of withstanding direct contact with the mind of a powerful psychic such as Betsy.

At the same time Matsu'o strikes a deal with the extra-dimensional sorceress Spiral, a begrudging servant of Mojo, to ensure Kwannon's physical body is healed enough to survive the stresses of the procedure. As Mojo and Spiral have a marked interest in Betsy - and the continued transmission of the feed from the bionic eyes they implanted in her body some time ago - Spiral also uses her magic and the alien technology of her Body Shoppe to intermingle the DNA of the two women. The two bodies now share genetic traits and mutations such as purple hair and eyes, both possessing true telepathic abilities, and have a physical resemblance to each other despite their different races. This resemblance is strong enough that Wolverine is able to recognise Betsy's face upon seeing her for the first time in Kwannon's body, and later notes that both bodies share a similar smell. Both women are also now able to create psychic weapons - Psylocke a blade of focused telepathic energy from the back of her right hand, and Kwannon a psychic katana construct.

Due to the extreme damage to Kwannon's mind - and possible further intervention from Spiral, who at one point claims responsibility - the switching of minds between the two women is only partially successful. Betsy in Kwannon's body retains all of her memories, but gains the martial arts and other expertise of Kwannon, as well as some of her preferences and personality traits (she shows a liking for East Asian themed clothing and decorations, is generally more aggressive and pursues a flirtation with Cyclops). While Kwannon awakens an amnesiac invalid - essentially a blank slate - but now speaks with a British accent, even while speaking Japanese, and can also read in this language.

Betsy briefly operates as The Mandarin's assassin before breaking free and rejoining the X-Men. Meanwhile, Spiral meets with Nyoirin, heavily implying that Betsy's former body now contains the remnants of Kwannon's mind. Seizing this opportunity, Nyoirin takes this body back to his estate, nursing Kwannon back to physical health, while at the same time retraining her and feeding her lies regarding her history and identity. To prove her readiness to confront the X-Men and her 'other self', Kwannon, in a partial duplicate of Betsy's former armor, defeats a gang of street thugs on the streets of Tokyo and then later slaughters ninja at Nyoirin's estate. During this time Nyoirin specifically refers to her as Kwannon, while Kwannon states her goal is to "regain her rightful place as (Nyoirin's) elite assassin" - making it clear both are aware of her true identity.

At Nyoirin's behest Kwannon travels to America, infiltrating the X-Mansion and showing enough skill with her telepathy to mask her mind from Jean Grey, Charles Xavier and Betsy. She confronts Betsy in the Danger Room while wearing a facsimile of her former armor, and is shown manifesting her psychic katana on panel for the first time; using the weapon to incapacitate her. Confronted by Charles Xavier and multiple X-Men, Kwannon states that she is the real Betsy Braddock, and that the Psylocke they are harboring is an imposter sent by Nyoirin to assassinate them all. As Kwannon is in Betsy's former body, their scents are the same and even the mansion computer registers their energy signatures as duplicates, there is considerable doubt as to the veracity of Betsy's identity. Even Charles Xavier and Jean Grey are unable to immediately telepathically discern the truth, with both women sharing surface psi-signatures. This is exacerbated when Betsy refuses a deeper telepathic scan as she does not want her mind violated, while Kwannon willingly offers to submit - something Betsy notes is "masterfully played". Kwannon also displays intimate knowledge of the X-Men, recognising those present, and correctly identifying that she has never previously met Professor Xavier (whether this is due to careful research on Kwannon and Nyoirin's behalf, or memories she gained from Betsy is never made clear).

Betsy and Kwannon preferred to settle the question of their identities through combat. However Charles Xavier and Wolverine note anomalies in Kwannon's story - her scent is different from Betsy's from before she went through the Siege, and she is now proficient in Ninjitsu - it's therefore decided that Kwannon, now calling herself Revanche, along with Betsy as Psylocke, and the X-Men Gambit and Beast will travel to Japan to search for answers. A rationale for Revanche's choice of new codename is never stated on panel, though it presumably refers to her stated intent of reclaiming her life from Betsy. Revanche also debuts a new costume, which incorporates colours and elements from Betsy's former Psylocke armor.

Infiltrating Nyoirin's estate, Kwannon demonstrates intimate knowledge of the buildings and defenses, claiming this is due to being held prisoner there for months. She leads the X-Men to Nyoirin's study, which contains a large portrait of Betsy in Kwannon's body, titled "Kwannon In Repose" - Revanche states this is proof of Betsy's treachery, however the portrait features purple hair, which Kwannon's body only gained after the mind swap, so it is clearly part of a larger deception by Revanche and Nyoirin. The quartet are ambushed by Silver Samurai, who is easily dispatched by Psylocke and Revanche, with the two demonstrating mirrored fighting styles and instinctively coordinated attacks, as they did while fighting ninja earlier.

The battle with Silver Samurai reveals a hidden scroll written by Nyoirin, which Revanche is able to read despite it being written in Japanese. She then stabs Psylocke with her psychic katana, preventing her from leaving while she reads a story from the scroll (and seems to project the images from this story into Psylocke's mind) that seems to explain what happened to the two: while on assignment, Kwannon found Betsy who had just emerged from the Siege Perilous, her body and mind fractured. When the two touched their minds fused, with a confused Psylocke running off and becoming brain-washed by Matsu'o and The Mandarin, while Revanche ended up in a sanitarium, and was eventually found by Nyoirin. A key factor demonstrating the falseness of this story is that Psylocke is showing emerging from the Siege fully clothed in her armor, while anyone truly emerging from the Siege Perilous does so naked. The four are then confronted by Nyoirin. After a standoff, he insists that the two women have merged minds and identities, and sends them after Matsu'o. Of note the narration in issue #22 states that Revanche is seeking answers about her identity, which contradicts previous issues where she is clearly a willing participant in Nyoirin's deception.

Psylocke and Revanche then confront Matsu'o in his home, grievously wounding him and further demonstrating their coordinated fighting style. Matsu'o also insists that the two women have combined identities, with he and Nyoirin each having deliberately moulded them into assassins.

Upon returning from Japan Psylocke and Revanche spar, trying to come to an understanding about their current state of being. It's stated that even though they move and function in concert, they are unable to read each other's minds. A conversation at the end of the issue further implies that Revanche is not who she says she is. Revanche is accepted by the X-Men, and is present during a meeting regarding Magneto's attack on the Earth, Thanksgiving celebrations, and accompanies a team of X-Men to Genosha while Psylocke is left behind.

Seeking answers, Psylocke finally agrees to let Jean Grey probe her mind, with Jean finding that the two women have been fused on a fundamental level. While on a mission with the X-Men's Blue team Revanche reveals she is suffering from the Legacy Virus, a lethal infection that is fatal to mutants. Her reaction to her illness and subsequent behaviour further call the truth of her claims into question, while Psylocke alternately displays concern and antagonism toward her.

With her death approaching Revanche departs the X-Mansion in the middle of the night, leaving behind the bionic eyes that had been implanted in her body and a note confessing her duplicity in attempting to assume Psylocke's identity. At the same time Spiral visits Matsu'o, confessing her part in merging the two women. Journeying to Japan Revanche confronts Matsu'o for his part in her ordeal, stating that the Legacy Virus is increasing her telepathic powers as it builds to her death; allowing her to cut through the fog of her memory, and the lies told by Nyoirin, to the truth. Even as she painfully probes Matsu'o's mind he still refuses to see Revanche as she currently is, picturing her as Psylocke instead. He also continues to insist that he had no knowledge of the two women switching bodies until after the fact, suggesting an extreme level of denial as to his part in the body swap. However, he does confess that once he did realise he tried to mould Psylocke into a facsimile of Revanche, hoping that having her body would be enough; while Revanche confesses that what she believed to be her previous memories were actually based on lies and a fictitious diary created by Nyoirin specifically to keep her away from Matsu'o. This explains why she failed to recognise Matsu'o during their previous encounter, while Matsu'o states he pretended not to know her as part of some penance for the wrongs he had visited upon her.

With the moment of her death imminent Revanche begs Matsu'o to kill her, which he does. Her death is felt telepathically by Psylocke and Archangel, while the final truth and some of the telepathic energy she wielded is imprinted onto Matsu'o.

Psylocke is visited by Spiral, who confesses her part in proceedings and hints she should use the bionic eyes to show her the truth. Psylocke watches a playback from the time of her transformation, recorded by the eyes, which answers many questions regarding Matsu'o, Nyoirin, The Mandarin and Spiral's involvement. She also realises that Revanche was unconsciously using her telepathic powers to create anger and confusion in the minds around her, explaining the aggressive reactions of some of the X-Men; and likely explaining away plot holes like why Psylocke or Revanche didn't simply read Nyoirin or Matsu'o's minds when they confronted them.

This information leads her back to Japan, where she finds Matsu'o, who has killed Nyoirin for his part in things. Matsu'o presents her with the final truth regarding the body swap, confirming that Revanche was never comfortable with the telepathic abilities she gained and projected that anger and discomfort into the minds around her; and that ultimately she came to respect Psylocke and the X-Men. He is then able to use the final burst of Revanche's telepathic energy to take away all of Kwannon's memories from Psylocke (thought she retains her martial arts skills and abilities).

Psylocke and Matsu'o then bury Kwannon, putting their history behind them and departing peacefully.

Much later the Sisterhood of Mutants stole this body from a grave in Tokyo (it seems Kwannon's final body was moved by Matsu'o, as this is not the original location of her grave) and performed a ritual using a captured Psylocke, which forcibly restored Betsy to her original body and under the control of the Red Queen. In a final confrontation, Betsy faced off against Dazzler, attacking her with her psionic blade. Alison defended herself, channeling the ambient noise of San Francisco into an intense laser beam, burning off half of Betsy's face and allowing her to regain control. Betsy drove her blade into her own head and confronted the darker counterpart controlling her body on the astral plane. Betsy eventually won, and her psyche returned to Kwannon's body, leaving her original body a corpse yet again. In the aftermath, Psylocke identifies the body as genuine and travels to Japan, intending to re-inter Kwannon, but during an attack by agents of the Hand her original body is destroyed, at the behest of Matsu'o. Psylocke eventually realises this is an attempt by Matsu'o to goad her into performing a mercy killing on him. Psylocke eventually agrees, and projects an illusion of herself as Kwannon to comfort him in his final moments.

Resurrection in Original Body
During the "Hunt for Wolverine" storyline, Psylocke's soul is absorbed by Sapphire Styx, leaving her body dead. As Psylocke's soul escapes, Styx's body explodes and she instinctively reforms a new body, identical to her original British body, from Styx's soul power. Later, Kwannon is revealed to be returned to life in her original body. She ambushes a henchman in Viper's penthouse, stating in Japanese that she has some questions and manifesting one of Psylocke's psychic knives.

Kwannon reappeared in East Transia when the X-Men took on a new version Brotherhood of Evil Mutants. Finding out that this Magneto was actually the clone Joseph, Kwannon killed him with her sword, then told the X-Men while speaking in Japanese that she was trying to remember them and that she was nothing as translated by Wolverine. She said she killed Joseph because he was a weapon to be used to erase mutants from the world if not stopped.

Dawn of X
In the new status quo for mutants post House of X and Powers of X, Kwannon is amongst the gathered mutants of Krakoa to celebrate their new lives. She is seen by Elizabeth Braddock, but both avoid a direct contact with each other. Still trying to find her place in this new era, she becomes part of a loose group of mutants that include Kid Cable and X-23, as the Fallen Angels of this new paradise.

Soon after, she assumes a leadership role in another team of outcast mutants: the Hellions, alongside Havok, John Greycrow (formerly Scalphunter), Empath, Wild Child, Mister Sinister, Nanny and Orphan-Maker. When Betsy arrives on Krakoa, she actively avoids Kwannon due to having taken over her body for many years and corrects several people who attempt to refer to her as Psylocke. During Excalibur, Betsy is accidentally transported into the body of Queen Elizabeth III, an alternate reality version of herself. In this reality, Kwannon is the ex-wife of Angel, the Queen's lover and she reluctantly helps Betsy find her way to Otherworld so that she can return to her original universe. Betsy attempts to find out more about the life of this Kwannon but, after Kwannon reads her mind and finds out about their history, she becomes angry and sends Betsy away. When Betsy returns to her original reality, her teammates suspect that the woman presenting as Betsy is not the real one. As Rogue and Rictor search Apocalypse's lab for answers, they are attacked by Betsy but are saved by Kwannon, who states that it is not the real Betsy Braddock. Kwannon joins a magic ritual that aims to reunite Betsy's consciousness with a clone body but, when this fails, she releases Betsy's consciousness, much to the anger of Excalibur. Kwannon states that only she will be able to find Betsy and heads into Otherworld, where she locates Betsy's consciousness attacking a village. The two battle psychically, with Betsy stating that she is in too much pain over her failures and over what she did to Kwannon that she feels as though she can't go on and demands Kwannon leave her spirit to rest, but Kwannon states that her spirit is hurting others and tells her that she is worthy to be Captain Britain. Kwannon explains that neither of them were at fault for Betsy taking over her body and that there was no way to "fix" what had happened, rather they both just have to accept that there will always be a connection between them. Kwannon then takes Betsy's soul back to their original reality and returns it to her body, bringing her back to life and finally ending their previous animosity.

During the events of Inferno, Psylocke replaced Gorgon as one of the Great Captains of Krakoa.

Abilities
Previous to the exchanging bodies with Betsy Braddock, Kwannon was said to be an "intuitive empath" with "low-level telepathic abilities". The extent and origin of these abilities is unknown. Upon inhabiting Braddock's body she gained telepathic abilities and the power to generate a katana and other bladed weapon constructs composed of psionic energy. These blades were capable of disrupting a person's neural functions on contact, generally rendering them unconscious. The appearance of the katana varied; on at least one occasion Kwannon was shown to generate a small psychic dagger instead of a full blade. Using her psi-blade, Kwannon could force her way into another telepath's mind.

Though her new body had originally possessed a wide range of telepathic abilities, Kwannon very rarely utilized them. In combat she relied almost solely on her martial arts skill and psychic katana. However, she was shown to possess enough skill and power to successfully shield her mind from Jean Grey's telepathic scans and sneak into the X-Mansion undetected. It was later explained that because of the discomfort of using her newfound telepathy, Kwannon unconsciously projected her frustration and confusion onto the X-Men whenever she was around them, causing them to be more agitated and aggressive in return, and to believe the same lies she herself had been told by Nyoirin. This manipulation was so subtle that none of the X-Men's other telepaths were able to detect it.

Once infected with the Legacy Virus, Kwannon's telepathic powers increased to the point where she was able to cut through the fog of her own clouded memories and recall the truth of her origins. She was also shown to read minds and project her own thoughts, even across continents, and to psionically mask her mind from Professor Xavier's own telepathic abilities, even while standing right beside him. Shortly before her death, Kwannon displayed a butterfly-like psychic energy aura whenever using her powers, as Braddock did in both her original and Japanese bodies. Kwannon was also somehow able to temporarily imprint Matsu'o Tsurayaba with telepathic energy that freed Braddock of the portions of Kwannon's mind she had absorbed.

After resurrection in her original body, Kwannon has displayed a wider range of telepathic abilities: the capacity to generate the same 'blades' of disruptive psionic energy that Betsy Braddock manifested while in possession of Kwannon's body, the ability to read and project thoughts, project her astral form into the astral plane or into the minds of others, and to identify and track mental signatures over long distances. She often uses her telepathy to read and counter the movements of opponents in physical combat. On various occasions, she also has demonstrated mid-level telekinesis, enabling her to levitate, move and manipulate objects and matter with her mind.  She floats in the air when meditating  and once created a pair of psionic butterfly wings to fly a longer distance.

Other versions

Ultimate Marvel
The Ultimate Marvel version of Kwannon appears in Ultimate X-Men, in which she and that universe's Elisabeth Braddock are body-swapped as are their Earth-616 counterparts. In this continuity, Braddock is a member of S.T.R.I.K.E.'s Psi-Division who is killed by Colossus to destroy Proteus, who has taken her as his host. She later appears at the gala celebration held at the X-Mansion, explaining that, after she died, her consciousness migrated to the body of a comatose Japanese girl named Kwannon. Due to the age difference between these versions of the characters, upon inhabiting Kwannon's body, Braddock was too young to be a S.T.R.I.K.E. agent, instead working undercover for Professor Xavier and joining the X-Men.

House of M
Kwannon, in Psylocke's original body post bodyswap, was seen in the House of M altered reality as a member of Magneto's elite guards.

In other media
The iteration of Psylocke with Betsy Braddock's mind in Kwannon's body has been featured in media other than comic books, including a non-speaking cameo in the 1992 X-Men animated television series, a variety of video games, as well as film portrayals by Meiling Melançon in the 2006 film X-Men: The Last Stand and by Olivia Munn in the 2016 film X-Men: Apocalypse.

Since Kwannon's in-story return to her original body and adoption of the Psylocke moniker, the character has been featured as a purchasable outfit in Fortnite Battle Royale.

See also

Kwannon

References

External links
 Spotlight on Revanche at UncannyXmen.net
 

Asian superheroes
Characters created by Fabian Nicieza
Comics characters introduced in 1993
Fictional female assassins
Marvel Comics cyborgs
Fictional empaths
Fictional energy swordfighters
Fictional female ninja
Fictional female swordfighters
Fictional swordfighters in comics
Japanese superheroes
Marvel Comics characters who have mental powers
Marvel Comics martial artists
Marvel Comics mutants
Marvel Comics telekinetics
Marvel Comics telepaths
Marvel Comics female superheroes
X-Men members